Victor Cohen may refer to
Benjamin Victor Cohen (1894–1983), American political figure
Victor Cohen Hadria (born 1949), French writer